Senua is a  village located in Longding district  ( earlier Tirap district of  Arunachal Pradesh in India.

References

Villages in Longding district